The Piwnica pod Baranami is a Polish literary cabaret located in Kraków, Poland. For over thirty years, in the People's Republic of Poland, Piwnica pod Baranami served as the most renowned political cabaret in the country, until the end of (and beyond) the communist era. Created by Piotr Skrzynecki in 1956, the cabaret continues its activities, contrary to rumours that it has been closed after the death of its founder in 1997. It resides at its original location in the medieval Old Town district, at the Main Market Square (next to Vis-á-vis café).

At first, the facility was a meeting place for Kraków students. It was a club for creative youth (Klub Młodzieży Twórczej), part of the Old Town Community Centre in the Palace under the Rams (Pałac Pod Baranami). The stage was formed by young artists of many different genres: writers, musicians, visual artists and actors, as well as their friends and faithful audiences. After nearly fifty years Piwnica became a legend of local eccentricity, and the style of the Piwnica cabaret entered the colloquial language as the "underground (piwnica) style" of performance. An account of the cabaret performance at Piwnica is given in a 2010 book A Long, Long Time Ago & Essentially True by Brigid Pasulka.

Piwnica's influence has reached beyond the art; it has been described thus: "It was much more than a cabaret. It was a breath of freedom and of ironic distance to the reality which surrounded us."

Artists of Piwnica pod Baranami 

 Bronisław Chromy
 Ewa Demarczyk
 Leszek Długosz
 Stefan Dymiter
 Anna Dymna
 Wiesław Dymny
 Janina Garycka
 Jan Güntner
 Tamara Kalinowska
 Krzysztof Komeda
 Zygmunt Konieczny
 Andrzej Kurylewicz
 Tadeusz Kwinta

 Kika Lelicińska
 Krzysztof Litwin
 Stanisław Radwan
 Barbara Nawratowicz
 Jan Nowicki
 Maria Nowotarska
 Mirosław Obłoński
 Joanna Olczak-Ronikier
 Agnieszka Osiecka
 Krzysztof Penderecki
 Joanna Plewińska

 Mieczysław Święcicki
 Kika Szaszkiewiczowa
 Jerzy Turowicz
 Jerzy Vetulani
 Andrzej Wajda
 Kazimierz Wiśniak
 Dorota Terakowska
 Grzegorz Turnau
 Leszek Wójtowicz
 Krystyna Zachwatowicz
 Andrzej Zarycki
 Dorota Ślęzak
 Ewa Wnuk- Krzyzanowska

References

External links
  Tomasz Handzlik, Cenne pamiątki piwniczne nie zginą Gazeta Kraków

Bibliography 
 Joanna Olczak-Ronikier: Piwnica pod Baranami, Wydawnictwo Tenten, Warsaw 1994, reissue 2002 by Prószyński i S-ka, 
 Joanna Olczak-Ronikier: Piotr, Wydawnictwo Literackie 1998, 
 Jolanta Drużyńska, Stanisław M. Jankowski: Kolacja z konfidentem. Piwnica pod Baranami w dokumentach Służby Bezpieczeństwa, Kraków 2006
 Wacław Krupiński: Głowy piwniczne, Wydawnictwo Literackie 2007, 
 Barbara Nawratowicz: Piwnica pod Baranami. Początki i rozwój (1956-1963), Petrus, 2010
 Janusz R. Kowalczyk: Wracając do moich Baranów, Wydawnictwo Trio, Warsaw 2012, 

1956 establishments in Poland
Polish cabarets